In database computing, sqlnet.ora is a plain-text configuration file that contains the information (like tracing options, encryption, route of connections, external naming parameters etc.) on how both Oracle server and Oracle client have to use  Oracle Net (formerly Net8 or SQL*Net) capabilities for networked database access.

Location 

Sample file 

 NAMES.DIRECTORY_PATH= (LDAP, TNSNAMES, HOSTNAME) 
 NAMES.DEFAULT_DOMAIN = ORACLE.COM
 TRACE_LEVEL_CLIENT = ON
 SQLNET.EXPIRE_TIME = 30
 SQLNET.IDENTIX_FINGERPRINT_DATABASE = FINGRDB
 AUTOMATIC_IPC = ON
 SQLNET.AUTHENTICATION_SERVICES = (ALL)
 SQLNET.CRYPTO_CHECKSUM_CLIENT = ACCEPTED
 TNSPING.TRACE_DIRECTORY = /oracle/traces

Profile parameters 
This section lists and describes some sqlnet.ora file parameters.

References

Configuration files
Secure communication
Oracle Database